The team portable apparatus was an artistic gymnastics event held at the Summer Olympics.  It was only held at the 1952 and 1956 Olympic Games.  While it is no longer officially contested, it did contain many similarities to modern day rhythmic gymnastics.

Medalists

Team medal counts

References 

Team portable apparatus